The Electronic Music Awards is a music award show focused on electronic music genres that debuted on September 21, 2017 in Los Angeles. It was created by Paul Oakenfold and entertainment company Hunt & Crest and produced by Live L!ve Media. The show was live streamed via Twitter and Pluto TV and garnered 3.4 million views within 2.5 hours.

The 2017 event was hosted by Hannah Rad, Matt Medved, Robin Schulz & Vicky Vox. Performers included Moby, Juan Atkins, Autograf, Floorplan, Illenium, Kidnap Kid, Orbital, Ramzoid, Delano Smith, Goldfish, Madeaux & The Saunderson Brothers.

On May 8, 2018, it was announced that the show would make its sophomore debut on November 8, 2018 in Los Angeles produced by Hunt & Crest in partnership with Live Digital Entertainment. The 2018 show aimed to celebrate equality and excellence in electronic music, under the mission statement of, "We're All The Same On The Dance Floor".

Winners and nominations

2017
The following table provides the list of nominees and winners according to The Hollywood Reporter and Electronic Music Awards:

References

External links

American music awards
2017 music awards
Electronic music